Beautiful Gong Shim is a South Korean television series, starring Namkoong Min, Bang Min-ah, On Joo-wan and Seo Hyo-rim. It aired from May 14 to July 17, 2016, on SBS' Saturdays and Sundays at 22:00 (KST) time slot.

Plot 
Gong Shim (Bang Minah) always feels over-shadowed by her older sister Gong Mi (Seo Hyo-rim) due to the way the people around her treat the siblings. The beautiful Gong Mi, who works at a top-notch law firm, becomes the breadwinner of the family, while Gong Shim, considered to be ugly and awkward, is jobless. Gong Shim had to use all of her money to rent a room on the roof top of the rented-house her family is living in, as her previous bedroom is being used as Gong Mi's walk-in closet.

Having a plan to gather money for moving to Italy to pursue her dream of becoming an artist, Gong Shim decides to rent her rooftop room for $250 a month. This is when she meets Ahn Dan-tae (Namkoong Min), a lawyer who works voluntarily for those in need, despite his delinquent personality. After much misunderstanding, Dan-tae finally  moves into the rooftop room and he becomes friendly with the son of a wealthy family, Joon-soo, through helping him out. Joon-soo's grandmother is grieving over the loss of her real blood-related grandson, Joon-pyo, who was kidnapped as a child.

Dan-tae quickly endears himself to Joon-soo's grandmother, who entrusts him with the task of finding Joon-pyo. In the meantime, Gong Shim is selected to be the personal secretary of Joon-soo's father, because she is considered ugly and his wife thinks it is better to have an unqualified but not pretty secretary. Gong Shim gradually starts settling in at her company, with the help of Joon-soo, for whom she falls. Dan-tae, however, is becoming jealous of her affection towards their mutual friend. It also starts to be clear that Dan-tae might be the long lost Joon-pyo, although he does not remember his painful past of being kidnapped and witnessing his mother's death. Gong Mi becomes her sister's rival when she accidentally meets Joon-soo and decides to get closer to him, because he is rich.

Cast

Main cast 
 Namkoong Min as Ahn Dan-tae / Seok Joon-pyo
Jo Yeon-ho as young Dan-tae
A 32-year-old man, Ahn Dan-tae rents the rooftop room from Gong Shim. Despite his delinquent traits, he's actually a lawyer who owns a small independent firm. He works part-time as a designated driver at night for extra income. His will to become a lawyer appeared as a form of guilt, as his mother died during his unfair imprisonment for beating up a bully, who then used his connections to press charges. He shows increasing curiosity towards Gong Shim, and later develops feelings towards her. His past, however, still remains mysterious.

 Bang Min-ah as Gong Shim
A 24-year-old girl, Gong Shim is always under pressure for "being ugly" her whole life. She tries her best to get a job as she wants to get away from the family that treats her unequally to her sister. Her life starts to spice up as she meets Dan-tae and Joon-soo; getting herself into a love-triangle.

 On Joo-wan as Seok Joon-soo
A 28-year-old man, Seok Joon-soo is the temporary heir of Star Group whose father was born to his grandfathers mistress. Despite his good manner and personality, his grandmother still despises him because her beloved daughter died and her grandson was kidnapped at his birthday party when he turned one . His friendship with Dan-tae begins after Dan-tae saves him from a group of thugs and this friendship also leads him to meet Gong Shim.

 Seo Hyo-rim as Gong Mi
A 28-year-old girl, Gong Mi is a typical, self-aware beauty and a lawyer at a respected firm. Being used to getting spoiled, she always finds her ways to get what she wants; even if it means sacrificing her own younger sister. She decides to become Joon-soo's wife, and does everything to catch the rich man's attention.

Gong Shim's family 
 Oh Hyun-kyung as Joo Jae-boon
A 50-year-old woman, she is the Gong sisters' mother and a former Miss Gangneung.
 Woo Hyun as Gong Hyuk
A 52-year-old man, he is Gong sisters' father, and he has graduated from Ivy League law school.

Star Distribution Group characters 
 Jung Hye-sun as Nam Soon-cheon
A 78-year-old woman, she is Star Distribution Group's chairman, Seok Dae-hwang's mother, Joon-pyo and Joon-soo's grandmother
 Kyeon Mi-ri as Yeom Tae-hee
A 53-year-old woman, she is Seok Joon-soo's mother, Seok Dae-hwang's wife and a former singer.
 Kim Il-woo as Seok Dae-hwang
A 55-year-old man, he is Star Distribution Group's CEO, Joon-soo's father and chairman Seok Joo-cheol's child out of marriage
 Kim Byeong-ok as Yeom Tae-cheol
A 56-year-old man, he is Star Distribution Group's managing director, Yeom Tae-hee's older brother and Seok Joon-soo's outside uncle
 Sunwoo Yong-nyeo as Seok Dae-hwang's birth mother

People around Ahn Dan-tae
 Bang Eun-hee as Cheon Ji-yeon – Dan-tae's aunt
 Choi Hong-il as Ahn Soo-young – Dan-tae's father

Extended cast 
 Shin Soo-ho as Shin Goo-nam – Gong Shim's best friend
 Kim Byung-se as the law firm representative, lawyer
  as petrol station's owner
  as police
  as medical staff
  as secretary
  as lawyer Choi
 Ahn Soo-bin
 
  as Gong Shim's schoolmate
 
 
 
 Jo Hee-bong as salon's CEO
  as son of studio's owner
  as Ho-joong
  as doctor

Cameo appearances 
 Lee Hye-sook as lawyer's wife

Ratings
In the table below, the blue numbers represent the lowest ratings and the red numbers represent the highest ratings.

Original soundtrack

Part 1

Part 2

Part 3

Part 4

Part 5

Part 6

Part 7

Part 8

Part 9

International broadcast 
In the United States, the drama airs in the Los Angeles DMA free, over-the-air on LA 18 KSCI-TV (channel 18) with English subtitles, Sat-Sun 8:50PM, from May 28 to July 31, 2016.

Awards and nominations

References

External links

2016 South Korean television series debuts
2016 South Korean television series endings
Seoul Broadcasting System television dramas
Korean-language television shows
South Korean romantic comedy television series
Television series by Studio S